E. baileyi may refer to:

Eriogonum baileyi, species of wild buckwheat
Etheostoma baileyi, a fish species in the family Percidae

See also
Baileyi (disambiguation)